Valery Sigizmundavich Vyalichka (born 12 September 1966) is a retired Belarusian professional footballer.

Club career
He made his professional debut in the Soviet Second League in 1984 for FC Dinamo Brest.

Referee career
After retirement he started a new career as a referee. Vyalichka is known to have officiated at international level during the period from 2002 to 2011.

Honours
Dinamo Minsk
 Belarusian Premier League champion: 1992, 1992–93, 1993–94
 Belarusian Cup winner: 1992, 1993–94

References

External links
 

1966 births
Living people
Sportspeople from Brest, Belarus
Soviet footballers
Belarusian footballers
Soviet Top League players
Russian Premier League players
K League 1 players
Belarusian expatriate footballers
Expatriate footballers in Russia
Expatriate footballers in Israel
Expatriate footballers in South Korea
Belarusian expatriate sportspeople in South Korea
Belarusian expatriate sportspeople in Russia
Belarusian expatriate sportspeople in Israel
Belarusian football referees
Belarus international footballers
FC Dynamo Brest players
FC Baranovichi players
FC Dinamo Minsk players
Hapoel Rishon LeZion F.C. players
FC Spartak Moscow players
FC Lokomotiv Nizhny Novgorod players
Seongnam FC players
Association football forwards